The Miami Dolphins are a professional American football franchise based in Miami Gardens, Florida. They are members of the East Division of the American Football Conference (AFC) in the National Football League (NFL). The Dolphins began play in 1966 as an expansion team in the American Football League (AFL), and joined the NFL as part of the AFL–NFL merger. The team has played their home games at Hard Rock Stadium, originally known as Joe Robbie Stadium, Pro Player Stadium, Dolphins Stadium, Dolphin Stadium, Landshark Stadium, and Sun Life Stadium, since 1987. The Dolphins are currently owned by Stephen M. Ross.

There have been thirteen head coaches for the Dolphins franchise. The team's first head coach was George Wilson, who coached for four complete seasons. Don Shula, who coached the Dolphins for 26 consecutive seasons, is the franchise's all-time leader for the most regular-season games coached (392), the most regular-season game wins (257), the most playoff games coached (31), and the most playoff-game wins (17). Shula is also the only Dolphins head coach to win a Super Bowl with the team, winning two. He was named the United Press International (UPI) NFL Coach of the Year twice during his tenure with the Dolphins. Mike McDaniel is the current head coach of the Dolphins since his hiring on February 6, 2022.

Key

Coaches
Note: Statistics are accurate through the end of the 2022 NFL season.

Notes

References
General

Specific

Lists of National Football League head coaches by team
 
Head coaches